Alexandru Osipov (born 30 July 2000) is a Moldovan footballer who plays as a left winger for Bulgarian Second League club Krumovgrad.

Career
Osipov made his professional debut for Florești in the Moldovan National Division on 18 September 2020, starting against Dinamo-Auto Tiraspol before being substituted out in the 36th minute, with the match finishing as a 0–5 away loss.

Osipov signed for Sfântul Gheorghe Suruceni in January 2021.

Personal life
Osipov is of Russian descent.

References

External links
 

2000 births
Living people
Moldovan footballers
Moldova youth international footballers
Moldova under-21 international footballers
Moldovan expatriate footballers
Moldovan expatriate sportspeople in Armenia
Expatriate footballers in Armenia
Moldovan expatriate sportspeople in Portugal
Expatriate footballers in Portugal
Moldovan people of Russian descent
Association football wingers
FC Lori players
Leixões S.C. players
FC Florești players
FC Sfîntul Gheorghe players
FC Krumovgrad players
Armenian Premier League players
Moldovan Super Liga players